Bionicle: The Legend Reborn is a 2009 computer-animated science fantasy action film based on the Bionicle toy line by Lego. It is the fourth and final Bionicle film to be released. Distributed by Universal Studios Home Entertainment, the film is a stand-alone sequel to the trilogy of films released by Buena Vista Home Entertainment under the Miramax Home Entertainment label. It follows the toy line's 2009 story and features a different set of characters than that of the first three films. The Legend Reborn was released on September 15, 2009 in the United States and Canada, October 5 in the United Kingdom, and September 2 in Australia. The film stars Michael Dorn as the voice of Mata Nui.

The Legend Reborn was intended to be the start of a trilogy of films, but production on the sequels was cancelled due to Lego discontinuing the release of Bionicle toys in 2010. The story was concluded through other media outlets, including comic books and a web story titled the "Mata Nui Saga".

Plot 

Mata Nui (Michael Dorn), the Great Spirit of the Matoran universe on the watery moon of Aqua Magna, has been exiled from his home by his 'brother', the evil Makuta Teridax. Teridax took over his gigantic robot body just after Mata Nui's reawakening as the latter's spirit is transferred into the legendary Kanohi Mask of Life. The Mask escapes into space as Teridax begins his takeover of the Matoran Universe.

The Mask crash lands on the nearby Bara Magna, a remote, decaying wasteland planet filled with scrap parts and burnished metals. A Scarabax beetle watches as the Mask of Life creates a body for Mata Nui, who picks up the Scarabax. The beetle, later named Click, changes into a living shield after touching the mask. Just then, a scorpion-like being called a Vorox attacks Mata Nui. After a short struggle, he manages to break off its stinger and drive it away. Mata Nui takes the stinger as a weapon and encounters a villager named Metus (David Leisure), who warns Mata Nui of the deadly Bone Hunter and Skrall tribes.

Metus, a recruiter for the Agori natives, takes Mata Nui to the fiery village of Vulcanus, telling the ex-ruler about life on Bara Magna. Local villages scavenge for what remains, building shelters, survival gear and ultimately arenas where they can settle their disputes by putting the best Glatorian, fighters larger in stature than the Agori, from each village against one another. Metus introduces Mata Nui to Raanu (Armin Shimerman), the Agori leader of Vulcanus, during a fight between veteran fighter Strakk (Jeff Glen Bennett) and Vulcanus' troubled prime Glatorian, Ackar (Jim Cummings). Strakk concedes, but illegally attacks Ackar afterwards. Mata Nui intervenes and, though outclassed, accidentally uses his mask to transform the stinger into a sword. He forces Strakk to concede again, befriending Ackar in the process.

Metus later attempts to recruit Mata Nui as a Glatorian, who refuses. Ackar introduces the hero to Kiina (Marla Sokoloff), a feisty Glatorian from the water village of Tajun. In exchange for showing Mata Nui and Ackar a secret cavern underneath Tajun, Kiina requests to leave Bara Magna with Mata Nui, believing that anywhere is better than her native planet. On their way to Tajun, the three are ambushed by a Skopio beast in Sandray Canyon, along with a group of Bone Hunters, to whom an Agori traitor has revealed the Glatorians' destination. After trapping both the Skopio and Bone Hunters beneath a rockslide, they discover that Tajun has been attacked in Kiina's absence. Rescuing an injured Glatorian rookie, Gresh (Mark Famiglietti), the heroes follow Kiina to her caverns and Gresh tells them that the village was attacked by Skrall and Bone Hunters working together. Ackar is skeptical due to them being rival tribes, until the group spots Tuma, leader of the Skrall, searching the ruins with a pack of Bone Hunters. In the caverns, they also encounter Berix (James Arnold Taylor), a thief. While Berix tends to Gresh, the other three discover a laboratory containing a blueprint of Mata Nui's former robot body, hinting that Bara Magna may have a connection with the Matoran.

As the Glatorians leave, Gresh reveals his weapon was damaged; Ackar wonders if Mata Nui's mask would work on the Glatorian weapons, having witnessed Click's transformation in the arena. As his mask seems to work on things that are/were alive and most Glatorian weapons are made of bone or claw, Mata Nui successfully repairs and transforms their weapons, in the process granting the Glatorians elemental abilities of fire, water, and air for Ackar, Kiina, and Gresh respectively. As they travel to Gresh's home, the jungle village of Tesara, Ackar teaches Mata Nui to stay alert in battle and to study and find his opponent's weakness. Upon arrival, the Glatorians stop a fight between Vastus (James Arnold Taylor) and Tarix (Jeff Glen Bennett), urging the Agori to unite their villages against the Skrall-Bone Hunter alliance. Mata Nui proves himself by transforming Tarix's and Vastus' weapons.

Kiina follows Berix to the hot springs outside the village, convinced that he is the traitor. However, both are captured by the actual traitor. Upon being informed by Metus, Mata Nui ignores Ackar and Gresh's offers of assistance and sets off for the Skrall camp in the stone village of Roxtus on his own.

Mata Nui confronts Tuma and challenges him to a one-on-one fight for Kiina and Berix's freedom, and eventually defeats him by exploiting a vulnerable spot in Tuma's back, claiming Tuma's circular saw-shield. Metus reveals himself as the traitor, explaining how he got the Bone Hunters and the Skrall to unite, intending to lead them against the Agori, feeling that they never respected him. Reasoning that he will have taken over Bara Magna before the Glatorians realize his treachery and to keep it from being discovered, he orders the Skrall and Bone Hunters to kill Mata Nui, Kiina and Berix, but an immense being Resembling disgraced Glatorian Malum composed of other Scarabax beetles summoned by Click keeps them busy, allowing Mata Nui to use Tuma's shield to free Kiina and Berix. Ackar and Gresh join them, leading several Glatorians against the united army. Berix defeats several Bone Hunters despite his incompetence, but goes missing during the fight. Mata Nui captures and defeats Metus by transforming him into a snake, as a representation of what he truly is, and has the Glatorians combine their powers against the waves of Skrall and Bone Hunters, forcing them to retreat.

As the team watches the combined efforts of the Agori, Glatorians and Scarabax beetles pulling the villages together, they notice that the combined villages formed a large robotic body, similar to the one Mata Nui's spirit once inhabited. To further this, Berix reveals a coin with the Unity-Duty-Destiny symbol, the Bara Magna symbol, and the Mask of Life symbol on one side, and the Skrall symbol on the other; when Mata Nui realizes that the maze-like symbol forms a map, the team prepares to embark on their next adventure.

DVD extras 
 Extended ending ("Metus's Revenge") - Metus is out for revenge and it's up to Click to stop him.
 Deleted scenes
 "Bye Bye Babylon" music video by Cryoshell
 Character gallery
 Commercials

Music 
There are two licensed songs used in the ending credits of the movie:

 "Ride" - Presence
 "Bye Bye Babylon" - Cryoshell

Cast 
 Michael Dorn as Mata Nui
 Jim Cummings as Ackar
 Marla Sokoloff as Kiina
 James Arnold Taylor as Berix & Vastus
 Mark Famiglietti as Gresh
 David Leisure as Metus
 Armin Shimerman as Raanu
 Fred Tatasciore as Tuma
 Jeff Bennett as Strakk & Tarix
 Dee Bradley Baker as Bone Hunters, Skrall & Vorox
 Mark Baldo as Villagers

Production 
Unlike the first three films, The Legend Reborn was produced by Threshold Animation Studios and distributed by Universal Studios Home Entertainment, while the original trilogy was produced by Creative Capers Entertainment and distributed by Buena Vista Home Entertainment under the Miramax Home Entertainment label.

After reading the script the director, Mark Baldo thought of casting Michael Dorn of Star Trek for the voice of Mata Nui.

Click, Mata Nui's pet beetle, was intended to have a much smaller role the film: As written in the script, after the Mask of Life turns Click into an inanimate shield, he was intended to remain as such for the remainder of the film, presumably acting as a prop rather than a character. Mark Baldo proposed the idea that Click could turn back into a beetle at will, serving as a companion for Mata Nui. Greg Farshtey ultimately approved the idea, on account of finding it cute.

The film was to be the beginning of a new Bionicle trilogy, and the writers were working on a draft for a sequel, but the Lego company cancelled the toyline and, hence, the movies, forcing the storyline to be concluded via other forms of media.

References

External links 
 
 

2000s American animated films
2009 direct-to-video films
2009 films
2009 science fiction films
American animated science fiction films
Bionicle
Bionicle (film series)
Lego films
2009 computer-animated films
Universal Pictures direct-to-video animated films
Universal Pictures direct-to-video films
Cyborg films
American science fiction action films
Danish science fiction action films
Animated films about robots
2000s English-language films
Fiction set on desert planets
Films set on fictional planets